Robert Cleary may refer to:

Robert E. Cleary (born 1931), Sergeant Major of the Marine Corps 
Robert J. Cleary (born 1955), United States Attorney for the District of New Jersey and lead prosecutor in the Unabomber case
Bob Cleary (Robert Barry Cleary, 1936–2015), retired ice hockey player
Robert Cleary (priest) (died 1918), Archdeacon of Emly
Robbie Cleary, Canadian soccer player

See also
Robert Clary (1926–2022), French-American actor well-known for his role on Hogan's Heroes